Nikolay Nikolayevich Konstantinov  (2 January 1932 – 3 July 2021) was a leading Soviet and Russian mathematical educator and organizer of numerous mathematics competitions for high school students.  He is best known as the creator of the system of math schools and math classes and as the creator and chief organizer of the Tournament of the Towns. For his work he was awarded the Paul Erdős award in 1992.

Biography 
Konstantinov was born and grew up in Moscow, Soviet Union.  He graduated from the Physics Department of the Moscow State University in 1954, and later received a Ph.D. in physics.

In the 1950s, he started  a math circle in Moscow University and since the 1960s in a number of Moscow high schools.  He continued working with schools developing special classes with mathematics concentration and individual approach to learning.  His students went on to win mathematics competitions on all levels and dozens of them became well-known mathematicians.

In 1978, Konstantinov started the Lomonosov tournament, a multi-subject science competition.  This tournament is continued every year since then.  In 1980, he started the international Tournament of the Towns which is now organized in over 150 towns in 25 countries.

Until his late 80s, Konstantinov continued working in Moscow High School 179 and was an editor of Kvant magazine, a popular Russian science publication.

In 1990, Konstantinov was one of the founders of Independent University of Moscow, one of the leading institutions of higher learning in mathematics in Russia.

Konstantinov died from the effects of COVID-19 on 3 July 2021, during the COVID-19 pandemic in Russia. He was 89 years old.

Books

Scholarly publications

References 

20th-century Russian mathematicians
1932 births
2021 deaths
Moscow State University alumni
Academic staff of the Independent University of Moscow
Mathematicians from Moscow
Soviet mathematicians
Mathematics educators
Soviet educators
Deaths from the COVID-19 pandemic in Russia